Munmun is a Bangladeshi actress who has appeared in 85 films. She started her career with the film Moumachhi (1996), directed by Ehtesham. She became one of the leading actresses of Bangladesh alongside Moushumi, Shabnur and Popy in the late 1990s till 2003. Her film include Raja, Dujonay (2000), Bishe Bhora Nagin (2000)

Career
Munmun appeared in 85 films in her career. She was a top actress of Dhallywood from 1999 till 2003. She is accused to bringing obscenity to Bangladeshi films alongside actresses Moyuri and Jhumka. She went to self-retirement in 2003 citing that she is not willing to stretch her career amid the flow of B-grade and erotic films.

References

Living people
Bangladeshi film actresses
Bangladeshi female models
20th-century Bangladeshi actresses
21st-century Bangladeshi actresses
1981 births